David or Dave Bartholomew may refer to:

 Dave Bartholomew (1918–2019), American musician
 D. J. Bartholomew (1931–2017), British statistician 
 David Ewen Bartholomew ( 1767/1768–1821), British naval officer